Adnan Smajić (born March 31, 1992) is a Bosnian former footballer who played as a forward.

Club career

Bosnia 
Smajić played at the youth level with Slavija Sarajevo.

He joined the senior team in 2011 in the Premier League of Bosnia and Herzegovina. He made his debut for Slavija on August 11, 2011, against FK Sarajevo. However, he experienced limited playing time as he received an injury early in the season. In total, he played in 6 matches in his debut season.

The following season he remained in the Bosnian top tier and secured a deal with NK Travnik. He made his debut for Travnik on August 12, 2012, against former club Sarajevo. His tenure was cut short with Travnik as he departed during the January transfer window. Throughout his stint with Travnik, he appeared in 7 matches. For the remainder of the 2012–13 season, he played in the First League of Bosnia and Herzegovina with Bosna Visoko. In 2013, he played with NK Famos Hrasnica.

Canada  
In 2015, he played abroad in the Canadian Soccer League with Milton SC. In his debut season with Milton, he assisted the club in securing a playoff berth by finishing seventh in the First Division. Milton was defeated in the opening round of the postseason by Toronto Croatia. He also played in the Second Division with the reserve team where he aided the club in securing a berth in the playoffs. He was featured in the championship final where he recorded a goal against SC Waterloo Region's reserve team to claim the title.

He re-signed with Milton for another season in 2016 where he was named the team captain. Smajić assisted the club in securing a playoff berth where they were eliminated in the first round by York Region Shooters. He finished as the team's top goal scorer with 12 goals which ranked him third in the overall scoring charts. He returned for his third season for Milton in 2017. Milton qualified for the playoffs and was once again eliminated in the quarterfinals by York Region.

References  

Living people
1992 births
Association football forwards
Bosnia and Herzegovina footballers
FK Slavija Sarajevo players
NK Travnik players
NK Bosna Visoko players 
FK Famos Hrasnica players
Milton SC players
Premier League of Bosnia and Herzegovina players
Canadian Soccer League (1998–present) players
Footballers from Sarajevo